Gordon A. "Gord" Paterson (born September 7, 1950 in Winnipeg, Manitoba) is a former slotback who played eight seasons in the Canadian Football League for the Winnipeg Blue Bombers and the Hamilton Tiger-Cats. He won the Dr. Beattie Martin Trophy in 1977 for the most outstanding Canadian player in the western division.

Paterson was also a curler, representing Manitoba at the 1983 Labatt Brier.

References 

1950 births
Canadian football slotbacks
Hamilton Tiger-Cats players
Living people
Manitoba Bisons football players
Players of Canadian football from Manitoba
Winnipeg Blue Bombers players
Curlers from Winnipeg